The 2001 AFC Women's Championship was a women's football tournament held in Taipei County, Taiwan (Chinese Taipei) between 4 and 16 December 2001. It was the 13th staging of the AFC Women's Asian Cup, consisting of fourteen teams.

Teams

Group stage
A total of 14 teams were divided into two groups consisting five teams and a group consist four teams.

Group A

Group B

Group C

Knockout stage

Semi-finals

Third place match

Final

Awards

See also
 List of sporting events in Taiwan

External links
 RSSSF.com

Women's Championship
AFC Women's Asian Cup tournaments
International association football competitions hosted by Taiwan
Afc Women's Championship, 2001
Afc
AFC Women's Championship
AFC Championship